The Chinese Ambassador to Poland is the official representative of the People's Republic of China to the Republic of Poland.

List of representatives

See also 
China–Poland relations

References 

 
China
Poland